Richard Butler is the debut solo album of Richard Butler. Butler collaborated with Jon Carin on the album. It was released by Koch Records on 18 April 2006.  Upon release, the album was met with considerable critical acclaim. The Guardian called it "an unexpected triumph." Popmatters suggests, "This is probably the album that Coldplay will be making a few years down the line."
All instruments & engineering by Jon Carin.

Track listing
All lyrics written by Richard Butler; all music composed by Jon Carin; except where indicated
 "Good Days Bad Days" – 5:24
 "California" – 5:34
 "Breathe" – 4:29
 "Satellites" – 4:06
 "Broken Aeroplanes" (Butler, Carin, Tim Butler) – 4:46
 "Milk" – 4:35
 "Nothing's Wrong" – 6:38
 "Second to Second" – 4:55
 "Last Monkey" (Butler, Carin, Butler) – 4:38
 "Sentimental Airlines" – 5:03
 "Maybe Someday" – 4:58

Personnel
Richard Butler - vocals, artwork, associate producer
Jon Carin - instruments, production, engineer, mixing
Technical
Richard Dombrowski - art direction
Elizabeth Yoon - design
Jimmy Bruch - photography

References

2006 debut albums